Jersey Heritage is an independent trust in Jersey which is responsible for the island's major historic sites, museums, and public archives. It holds collections of artefacts, works of art, documents, specimens, and information relating to Jersey's history, culture, and environment.

The trust was formally registered in Jersey on 3 June 1983.

The trust is financed by an annual grant from the States of Jersey, and self-generated income.

Properties managed

Jersey Museum and Art Gallery
The Jersey Museum and Art Gallery is located at Weighbridge Place, in St Helier.

Jersey Archive
The Jersey Archive, established in 1993, is located in a building on Clarence Road, in St Helier.

It has the responsibility of cataloging and storing historical documents and works of art, and to make archived items available to the public.  This includes the initial examination of the Grouville Hoard, found in 2012.

The research staff at the facility will assist anyone with local research on subjects such as family history, the history of buildings, and the occupation of the Channel Islands.

Other properties managed
Jersey Maritime Museum, New North Quay, St Helier
Occupation Tapestry Gallery at the Maritime Museum
Mont Orgueil Castle, Gorey
Elizabeth Castle, St Helier
Hamptonne Country Life Museum
La Hougue Bie
Seymour Tower
La Rocco tower
Fisherman's Cottage, St Helier
Marine Peilstand 2, also known as Radio Tower
La Crête Fort
La Tour Cârrée
L’Etacquerel Fort
Fort Leicester, 19th century fort
Lewis Tower
Kempt Tower
Archirondel Tower
Barge Aground, seaside folly built in the 1930s

See also
 Guernsey Society
 Jersey Society in London
 Société Jersiaise

References

External links

Non-profit organisations based in Jersey
Jersey culture
Tourist attractions in Jersey
1983 establishments in Jersey
Organizations established in 1983